Maurice Hinton Foley (4 February 1930 – 1 July 2013) was an Australian cricketer and Olympic field hockey player. He played three first-class matches for Western Australia in 1953/54.  In 1956 he was a member of the Australian team at the 1956 Melbourne Olympics in field hockey. Foley was born in Perth and died in Broome, Western Australia.

References

External links
 

1930 births
2013 deaths
Australian cricketers
Western Australia cricketers
Australian male field hockey players
Olympic field hockey players of Australia
Field hockey players at the 1956 Summer Olympics
People educated at Trinity College, Perth
Cricketers from Perth, Western Australia
Field hockey players from Perth, Western Australia